Serie B is an Italian minor baseball league. It consists of three divisions (Divisions A, B and C) and, through 2011, is made up of 29 teams.

References

Baseball competitions in Italy
Baseball leagues in Europe
Sports leagues in Italy